The Farmiloe Building is a Grade II listed building in Clerkenwell, London, in the London Borough of Islington.

History
The Farmiloe Building, of Victorian architecture, was completed by Browne & Robinson in 1868. The architect for the building was Lewis Henry Isaacs. The Farmiloe Building became a Grade II listed building on 20 December 1991. The business George Farmiloe & Sons used the building as its base until 1999. In June 2005, Film London nominated the building as the location of the month. In 2014, plans were announced to transform the building into offices.

Use in media
The Farmiloe Building is a popular location for filming scenes. Films and television productions that have been shot at the building include:
Batman Begins (2005)
Eastern Promises (2007)
The Dark Knight (2008)
Sherlock Holmes (2009)
Inception (2010)
Spooks (2011)
Tinker Tailor Soldier Spy (film) (2011)
The Dark Knight Rises (2012)
What Remains (2013)
Mission: Impossible – Rogue Nation (2015)

References

Buildings and structures in Clerkenwell
Grade II listed buildings in the London Borough of Islington
Victorian architecture in England
DVD